Pseudisthmiade larrei is a species of beetle in the family Cerambycidae, the only species in the genus Pseudisthmiade.

References

Rhinotragini
Monotypic beetle genera